Sergi Darder Moll (born 22 December 1993) is a Spanish professional footballer who plays for RCD Espanyol as a central midfielder.

Club career

Espanyol and Málaga
Born in Artà, Balearic Islands, Darder played for two local clubs before joining RCD Espanyol in the summer of 2007, aged 13. His first season as a senior was 2011–12, when he competed with the reserves in the Tercera División.

In July 2012, Darder signed with Málaga CF, being assigned to the B side also in the fourth tier. The following year he impressed first-team manager Bernd Schuster who called him for the preseason, where he scored two goals, including one in a 3–2 defeat to Aston Villa at Villa Park on 10 August.

On 14 August 2013, it was announced that Darder was officially promoted to the main squad, along with Fabrice Olinga and Samuel. He made his La Liga debut three days later, starting the 1–0 away loss against Valencia CF.

Darder signed a professional contract with Málaga on 4 November 2013, running until 2017. He scored his first goal for the Andalusians on 31 March of the following year, the winner in a 2–1 win over Real Betis at the Estadio Benito Villamarín.

Lyon
On 30 August 2015, Darder joined Olympique Lyonnais on a five-year contract, for €12 million. His Ligue 1 debut arrived on 20 September, as he was replaced midway through the second half of a 1–1 draw at Olympique de Marseille.

Darder scored his second league goal of the season on 28 February 2016 – third overall – netting after a fine individual effort to help impose Paris Saint-Germain F.C. their first loss in 36 games (2–1 at Stade de Gerland).

Return to Espanyol
On 1 September 2017, Darder returned to Espanyol after agreeing to a one-year loan with an €8 million buyout clause. The move was made permanent on 5 March 2018 after the player made a required number of appearances, and he signed a five-year deal which was rendered effective on 1 July.

International career
All youth levels comprised, Darder earned 12 caps for Spain. His debut for the under-21 team arrived on 14 November 2013, as he played the last 35 minutes of a 6–1 away rout of Bosnia and Herzegovina in the 2015 UEFA European Championship qualifiers.

Honours
Espanyol
Segunda División: 2020–21

References

External links

1993 births
Living people
Spanish footballers
Footballers from Mallorca
Association football midfielders
La Liga players
Segunda División players
Tercera División players
RCD Espanyol B footballers
Atlético Malagueño players
Málaga CF players
RCD Espanyol footballers
Ligue 1 players
Olympique Lyonnais players
Spain youth international footballers
Spain under-21 international footballers
Spanish expatriate footballers
Expatriate footballers in France
Spanish expatriate sportspeople in France